Geoffrey Hinsliff (born 1937 in Leeds, West Riding of Yorkshire) is an English actor best known for his portrayal of Don Brennan in Coronation Street from 1987 to 1997. He had previously played other characters in the same programme, in 1963 and 1977.

He originally trained  at RADA, before making his television debut in an episode of Z-Cars. He went on to appear in Adam Adamant Lives!, Dixon of Dock Green, UFO, Crown Court, The Professionals and Heartbeat, and also played a wireless operator in the film A Bridge Too Far.

In 1978 Hinsliff appeared as a sergeant in an episode of the hard-hitting British police drama The Professionals, the episode entitled When the Heat Cools Off.

He also had a role in the comedy-drama Brass and appeared in two Doctor Who stories: Image of the Fendahl and Nightmare of Eden. He guest-starred in Holby City as an alcoholic in 2010.

Personal life
His daughter is the political journalist Gaby Hinsliff.

He lives in Winster in the Derbyshire Dales.

Filmography
O Lucky Man! (1973)
Smuga cienia (1976)
The Battle of Billy's Pond (1976) - Tanker Driver
I, Claudius (1976) - Rufrius
A Bridge Too Far (1977) - British Wireless Operator

References

External links
 
 Geoffrey Hinsliff at Theatricalia

1937 births
Living people
Alumni of RADA
English male television actors
Male actors from Leeds
People from Derbyshire Dales (district)